Lutovynivka is a small village, close to Kozelshchyna, in the Kozelshchynskyi Raion (district), Poltava Oblast (province) of central Ukraine, located  from Poltava. The current estimated population is around 500 (as of 2012). Lutovynivka is also a railway station, and located close to the highway M22-E584.

References 

Cities in Poltava Oblast